SAS 181 antwortet nicht (English-language title: SAS 181 Does Not Reply) is an East German black-and-white film, directed by Carl Balhaus. It was released in 1959.

Plot
Kurt, a young apprentice in a fishing commune and a member of the Technology and Sport Association, enters a race to show his maritime skills. After he fails to win, he falls in love with a girl named Anke, but she loves the apprentice Hannes. Kurt and Hannes sail with skipper Laue on one of the collective's boats, SAS 181. Laue pretends to be Kurt's friend and encourages a conflict between the two boys. However, they both realize that he intends to reach the Danish isle of Bornholm and defect to the West. The two settle their differences and, with the help of the old fisherman Jens, return the boat home.

Cast
 Ulrich Thein as Kurt
 Otmar Richter as Hannes
 Rita Gödikmeier as Anke
 Friedrich Wilhelm Junge as Linnet
 Erwin Geschonneck as Laue
 Wilhelm Koch-Hooge as Poppe
 Gustav Püttjer as Jens
 Erich Brauer as Laue's deck hand
 Hans Finohr as Kollmorgen
 Klaus Gendries as Eisermann
 Fritz Diez as collective director
 Harry Hindemith as Danish harbor manager
 Hans-Joachim Glaser as Spuchti
 Gerd Scheibel as Knautschke

Production
The film was the first in the history of East Germany to portray the pre-military youth training organization known as the Technology and Sport Association (GST). It was produced with the assistance of the association.

Reception
Heinz Kersten noted that the theme of "fleeing from the republic" - a common feature in East German films, which showed a person leaving the GDR for the West, grow disillusioned and sometimes commit suicide - was present in the plot of the SAS 181, as well. The Germa Film Lexicon cited it as having "an unimaginative plot".

References

External links
 

1959 films
East German films
1950s German-language films
German black-and-white films
Films directed by Carl Balhaus
Films set in the Baltic Sea